The article is about the list of state highways in the Indian state of Andhra Pradesh. SH 31 is the longest State Highway in Andhra Pradesh. The new state highways are recently added and new numbering system is given for state highways to improve infrastructure and connectivity.

Source:AP state highway maps

See also 
List of National Highways in India by State

References 

Andhra
State Highways